The Pestov–Ionin theorem in the differential geometry of plane curves states that every simple closed curve of curvature at most one encloses a unit disk.

History and generalizations
The theorem has been generalized further, to curves of bounded average curvature (singly differentiable, and satisfying a Lipschitz condition on the derivative), and to curves of bounded convex curvature (each point of the curve touches a unit disk that, within some small neighborhood of the point, remains interior to the curve).

Applications
The theorem has been applied in algorithms for motion planning. In particular it has been used for finding Dubins paths, shortest routes for vehicles that can move only in a forwards direction and that can turn left or right with a bounded turning radius. It has also been used for planning the motion of the cutter in a milling machine for pocket machining, and in reconstructing curves from scattered data points.

References

Theorems in differential geometry
Theorems about circles
Theorems about curves
Curvature (mathematics)